Boxing at the 2003 Afro-Asian Games was held from October 24 to October 31, 2003 at two stadia - GMC Balayogi Athletic Stadium and Gachibowli Indoor Stadium. Medals were awarded in eleven events, with each medal corresponding to a certain weight division ranging from Light Fly weight to Super Heavy weight.

The boxing program was almost exactly the same as that of the 2008 Summer Olympics. The events were all-male, and there were two bronze medalists for each weight category. Thus, a total of 44 medals were awarded.

Uzbekistan turned out to be the boxing powerhouse, as it swept five of the eleven gold medals. However, the host nation - India - got the maximum number of medals in total - 10 out of 44.

Medal summary

Source :

Medal table

References

2003 in African sport
2003 in Asian sport
2003 in Indian sport